Cavendish Pianos is a brand of pianos made at Yorkshire Pianos, the only company producing pianos still wholly built in the United Kingdom.

History
Inspired by the closure of the Yamaha Kemble factory in Milton Keynes, Adam Cox and his wife Charlie used their experience as piano dealers and repairers together with investment from the Duke and Duchess of Devonshire, to begin production of their own brand of pianos in the United Kingdom. The Cavendish name comes from the Duke of Devonshire, whose support was critical to the foundation of the firm. The Cox family, with three piano-playing daughters, have regularly acted as hosts for players in the Leeds International Piano Competition.

The firm was founded in 2012 after a three-year period of planning and research.  The first three Cavendish pianos were shown at the Musikmesse trade fair in Frankfurt in 2012.

In September 2013, Jamie Cullum visited the firm while recording a BBC Radio 4 documentary, Jamie Cullum's Piano Pilgrimage, due for broadcast in January 2014.

Pianos

Cavendish source their skills and materials from the Yorkshire area. The firm has organized and works with a network of local craftsmen who produce key parts of the pianos, which they call a "craftsman's co-operative". The firm also has links to Lincoln College, which is the last facility in the UK to teach piano technology, and it has provided employment to graduates of the college.

The firm currently produces five models of piano:

Grand pianos: 
Cavendish Baby Grand: 152 cm
Cavendish Boudoir Grand: 186 cm

Upright pianos: 
Cavendish Classic: 112 cm
Cavendish Contemporary: 121 cm
Cavendish Chatsworth: 124 cm
The Times notes in February 2013 that prices of the upright models start at £4,995, which reflects the British manufacture using traditional materials and skills.

Music Instrument Professional has reviewed the Cavendish Classic model which it says is "an affordable, compact piano built around a solid spruce soundboard. A family-focused instrument retailing at under £5,000, the Classic is built in the traditional way, with all wooden action and parts. The Chatsworth 125 was designed in the style of a 1920s British upright. From the cabinet maker build, solid walnut paneled case to the British ash and oak used in the pedal mechanism, this is a fairly unique specimen."

The company produces around 50 instruments per year.

Awards
2013 Shortlisted for Best Acoustic Piano at the MIA Music Awards 
2014 Winner of Best Acoustic Piano award at the MIA Music Awards

References

British brands
Piano manufacturing companies of the United Kingdom
2012 establishments in England
British companies established in 2012
Companies based in Craven District
Piano makers
Cavendish family